Mir Qahremanlu (also Romanized as Mīr Qahremānlū; also known as Qahremānlū) is a village in Salavat Rural District, Moradlu District, Meshgin Shahr County, Ardabil Province, Iran. At the 2006 census, its population was 47, in 9 families.

References 

Towns and villages in Meshgin Shahr County